Dancing Forever World Tour was the second concert tour by Taiwanese singer Jolin Tsai. It started on September 15, 2006, in Hong Kong, China at Hong Kong Coliseum and continued throughout Asia, Oceania, and North America before concluding on February 8, 2009, in Uncasville, United States at Mohegan Sun Arena. It grossed NT$1 billion from 28 shows and 500,000 attendance.

Background 
On August 7, 2004, Tsai embarked on her first concert tour J1 World Tour in Shanghai, China at Hongkou Football Stadium. It lasted one year and nine months and held a total of 8 shows in 7 cities, and it ended on April 22, 2006 in Irvine, United States at Bren Events Center. On May 12, 2006, she released her eighth studio album, Dancing Diva. On May 31, 2006, Tsai's manager Howard Chiang revealed that she would start her new tour in the second half of the year. On July 17, 2006, she announced that she would start her second concert tour Dancing Forever World Tour in Hong Kong, China at Hong Kong Coliseum on September 15, 2006.

Commercial reception 
The Shanghai date of the tour was available for sale on August 1, 2006, the first-day box office broke the Hongkou Football Stadium's first-day box office record, and the first-week box office exceeded ¥1.5 million RMB. The Taipei dates were available for sale on September 18, 2006, and all the 22,000 tickets were sold out within six days. Therefore, she announced that an additional Taipei show would be held on November 17, 2006, becoming the first singer to hold three consecutive shows at Taipei Arena in history. The additional Taipei date was available for sale on September 29, 2006, and all the 11,000 tickets were sold out by the end of October 21, 2006.

Controversies 
The dance moves in the tour were more difficult and dangerous than those of most artists, including gymnastics elements such as rings and pommel horse. However, some people criticized and thought that her concert was more like "playing acrobatics" and lost the original meaning of concert. Regarding this, Tsai responded: "Many of my songs are dance music, which can only be fully performed with dance. Those difficult gymnastics moves are the icing on the cake. I don't think they destroyed the integrity of the concert. After all, everyone's performance style is different."

Video release 

On June 8, 2007, Tsai released the live video album If You Think You Can, You Can! for the tour, which includes part of the performances at Taipei Arena in Taipei, Taiwan from November 17 to 19, 2006, one documentary, and four music videos from the album, Dancing Forever. In its first week of release, it topped the weekly video album sales charts of G-Music and Five Music in Taiwan, and it reached number two and number one on the yearly video album sales charts of G-Music and Five Music of 2007, respectively.

Set list

Shows

References 

2006 concert tours
2007 concert tours
2008 concert tours
2009 concert tours
Concert tours of Australia
Concert tours of China
Concert tours of Malaysia
Concert tours of Singapore
Concert tours of Taiwan
Concert tours of the United States
Jolin Tsai concert tours